Baehrens is a surname. Notable people with the surname include:

 Emil Baehrens (1848–1888), German classical scholar
 Heike Baehrens (born 1955), German deaconess, religious educator, and politician
 Wilhelm Baehrens (1885-1929), German classical scholar

See also
 Behrens